Rail Haven Motel, also known as Rail Haven Motor Court, is a historic traveler's accommodation located at Springfield, Greene County, Missouri. It was built in 1938 and enlarged in 1957.  It is an L-shaped motel complex that includes two Nine Unit Motel Buildings, Laundry, a 16 Unit Motel Building (1950), Original Laundry (1950), Office (1953), three Multiple Unit Motel Buildings (1938, c. 1957), the Thirty Unit Motel Building (1957), Swimming Pool and Pool House (1958), and Three Unit Motel Building (c. 1957).

It was added to the National Register of Historic Places in 2010. Today it operates as a Best Western franchise.

References

Hotel buildings on the National Register of Historic Places in Missouri
Hotel buildings completed in 1938
Buildings and structures in Springfield, Missouri
National Register of Historic Places in Greene County, Missouri